was a  after Chōryaku and before Kantoku. This period spanned the years from November 1040 through November 1044.

Change of era
 1040 : The new era name was created to mark an event or series of events. The previous era ended and the new one commenced in Chōryaku 4, on the 10th day of the 11th month of 1040.

Events of the Chōkyū era
 1040 (Chōkyū 1, 1st day of the 1st month): a partial eclipse of the sun, predicted for midday, occurred in mid-afternoon, causing complaints about the astronomers' lack of accuracy.
 1040 (Chōkyū 1, 9th month): The Sacred Mirror was burned in a fire.
 1041 (Chōkyū 2): The Sanjo Palace burned; and it was reconstructed.

Notes

References
 Ackroyd, Joyce. (1982) Lessons from History: The Tokushi Yoron. Brisbane: University of Queensland Press. ; OCLC 7574544 
 Brown, Delmer M. and Ichirō Ishida, eds. (1979).  Gukanshō: The Future and the Past. Berkeley: University of California Press. ;  OCLC 251325323
 Nussbaum, Louis-Frédéric and Käthe Roth. (2005).  Japan encyclopedia. Cambridge: Harvard University Press. ;  OCLC 58053128
 Titsingh, Isaac. (1834). Nihon Odai Ichiran; ou,  Annales des empereurs du Japon.  Paris: Royal Asiatic Society, Oriental Translation Fund of Great Britain and Ireland. OCLC 5850691
 Varley, H. Paul. (1980). A Chronicle of Gods and Sovereigns: Jinnō Shōtōki of Kitabatake Chikafusa. New York: Columbia University Press. ;  OCLC 6042764

External links
 National Diet Library, "The Japanese Calendar" -- historical overview plus illustrative images from library's collection

Japanese eras